Pizza Port Brewing Company is a brewpub with five locations in Southern California: Solana Beach, two in Carlsbad (Downtown and Bressi Ranch), Ocean Beach and San Clemente.  A former Pizza Port location in San Marcos spun out of Pizza Port in 2006 and is now an independent operation, the Port Brewing Company / Lost Abbey brewery. It has received multiple awards, including "Small Brewpub of the Year" for both 2003 and 2004 by the Great American Beer Festival and six awards for its beers at the World Beer Cup.

History
Pizza Port was established in March 1987 when it made pizza only in Solana Beach.  They installed a 7-barrel brewery and served their first handcrafted beer brewed on the premises in October 1992, becoming part of the "second wave" of craft breweries that led San Diego County to prominence in the craft brewing industry. Even before that, the restaurant's guest taps featuring local home-brewed beer were "hugely influential" in the development of San Diego's brewing culture.

Awards
The Solana Beach location was named Small Brewpub of the Year in both 2003 and 2004 by the Great American Beer Festival. In 2006, it was named one of the "Top 50 Places to Have a Beer in America" by beeradvocate.com. They have won over 100 GABF medals in total, and most of any craft brewery in History. The brews have won several prizes at the World Beer Cup, including 5 gold medals. In 2010, the Pizza Port family of breweries won 6 awards for its beers at the World Beer Cup and in 2012 they won 5 more.  In 2009, 2010 and 2011, Pizza Port Carlsbad was named Large Brewpub of the Year at the Great American Beer Festival.

Gallery

See also
 California breweries

References

External links 
 

Beer brewing companies based in San Diego County, California
Companies based in San Diego County, California